The National Union of Foundry Workers (NUFW) was a trade union representing workers in foundries in the United Kingdom.

History
The union was founded in 1920 with the merger of the Associated Iron Moulders of Scotland, the Amalgamated Society of Coremakers of Great Britain and Ireland and the Friendly Society of Iron Founders of England, Ireland and Wales.  The Scottish Brassmoulders' Union joined in 1942, and the Associated Iron, Steel and Brass Dressers of Scotland merged in during 1945.  In 1946, the union merged with the Ironfounding Workers' Association and the United Metal Founders' Society to form the Amalgamated Union of Foundry Workers.

Although many women worked in foundries during and after World War II, the NUFW only admitted men into its membership.

Election results
The union sponsored Arthur Henderson as a Labour Party candidate in several Parliamentary elections.

Leadership

General Secretaries
1920: Alfred Todd
1922: James Fulton
1925: Robert Tilling
1934: J. H. Codd
1938: Albert Wilkie
1944: Jim Gardner

Presidents
1920: Tom Chadwick

Assistant General Secretaries
1920: James Fulton
1922: Robert Tilling
1925: J. H. Codd
1934: Robert Smith

Further reading
Hubert Jim Fyrth and Henry Collins, The Foundry Workers: a trade union history

References

External links
Catalogue of the NUFW archives, held at the Modern Records Centre, University of Warwick

Trade unions established in 1920
Trade unions disestablished in 1946
Foundry workers' trade unions
Trade unions based in Greater Manchester